Hemmi is a surname. Notable people with the surname include:

Heini Hemmi (born 1949), Swiss alpine skier
Heinz Hemmi (1899–1985), Swiss sprinter
Masaki Hemmi (born 1986), Japanese footballer and coach
Ulrich Hemmi (1829–1895), American politician